Trung Hoà–Nhân Chính is a borough in southwestern Hanoi, the capital of Vietnam.

The borough comprises the Trung Hoà ward of Cầu Giấy District and Nhân Chính ward of Thanh Xuân District. According to the Đô thị e-magazine, the borough was Hanoi's most desirable urban area in 2008.

Headquarters
Trung Hoà–Nhân Chính is a centre of important headquarters, banks and enterprises. The area features mother roads of the city which link to Hoà Lạc high-tech park and Hà Tây in the south.

Various significant buildings are listed in this area, which include:
 Keangnam Hanoi Landmark Tower - Vietnam's highest building
 Vietnam National Convention Center
 MobiFone headquarter
 Big C Thang Long - Hanoi's largest retail hypermarket
 Thanh Xuân gymnasium
 Hanoi – Amsterdam High School

Financial centers
A variety of banks and security companies have been being opened in Trung Hoà–Nhân Chính, which includes:
Asia Commercial Bank
Bank for Investment and Development of Vietnam
VP Bank
Agribank
Techcombank
Habubank
Vietcombank
GP Bank
PG Bank
Military Bank
Mekong Housing Bank

Major roads
Phạm Hùng Boulevard – links central Thanh Xuân district to western Cầu Giấy district
Tran Duy Hung Boulevard – links western Đống Đa District to the western Thanh Xuân district
Le Van Luong Boulevard (lengthened continuation of Lang Ha Avenue) – links central Đống Đa District to Hà Đông
Khuat Duy Tien Boulevard – links the central to the western parts of Thanh Xuân District 
Thang Long Boulevard – links central South West to the Hòa Lạc hi-tech park

References

Populated places in Hanoi
Buildings and structures in Hanoi